Gruta de Lourdes  is an underground metro station on the Line 5 of the Santiago Metro, in Santiago, Chile. It is located close to the western branch of the Autopista Central and the Basilica of Lourdes. East of the station, Line 5 runs beneath Quinta Normal Park. The station was opened on 12 January 2010 as part of the extension of the line from Quinta Normal to Pudahuel.

The station features a mined train hall and transept. Both tunnels, which have an oval cross section, were excavated from a deep open pit. A street-level pavilion with glazed walls contains the fare control.

At the platform level, the walls are paneled with rectangular tiles in blue tones, which are made of pre-painted perforated aluminum.

References

Santiago Metro stations
Railway stations opened in 2010
Santiago Metro Line 5